Terry Hayes (born August 16, 1958) is an American wheelchair fencer. She competed at the 2020 Summer Paralympics .

Life 
She graduated from Tidewater Community College, Barton College, Old Dominion University, and George Mason University, and competes in épée, foil and sabre. In 2012, she was diagnosed with Primary cerebellar degeneration

She competed at the  2018 IWAS Wheelchair Fencing American Championship, and 2019 Wheelchair Fencing World Championships.
Hayes and teammate Shelby Jensen are the first Americans to qualify in all three weapons in the Paralympics. At age 63, she was the oldest member of the Team USA Paralympic team.
She is coached by Charles B. Johnson and Dr. Brent M. Myers of Southwest Florida Fencing Academy and Mickey Zeljkovic of Zeljkovic Fencing Academy.

References

External links 

 Paralympian fencer to compete internationally - 13News Now - June 11, 2021

1958 births
Living people
American female épée fencers
American female foil fencers
American female sabre fencers
Paralympic wheelchair fencers of the United States
Wheelchair fencers at the 2020 Summer Paralympics
21st-century American women